Meir Kahane, an Israeli American rabbi, ultra-nationalist politician and militant, was assassinated by El Sayyid Nosair on 5 November 1990, shortly after 9:00 p.m. at the New York Marriott East Side hotel in Manhattan, New York City.

Assassination 
On the evening of 5 November 1990, Kahane gave a speech in the second-floor lecture hall of the New York Marriott East Side hotel, in Manhattan, at 525 Lexington Avenue, to an audience, most of whom were Orthodox Jews. After his speech, a crowd of well-wishers gathered around Kahane as he answered questions. Shortly after 9:00 p.m., a man disguised as an Orthodox Jew approached Kahane and shot him from close range with a .357-caliber pistol. Kahane was hit in the neck by the gunfire and died of his wounds shortly thereafter.

After shooting Kahane, the assassin fled from the hotel and reached Lexington Avenue, where, in front of a post office, he attempted to take over a taxi at gunpoint. Carlos Acosta, an on-duty postal police officer, drew his pistol and ordered the assassin to freeze. Instead, the assassin turned toward the officer and shot and hit him in the chest. The officer returned fire, hitting the assassin in the chin. Afterwards, the officer arrested the man. Born in Egypt, he was American citizen El Sayyid Nosair, who had been living in Jersey City, New Jersey.

At the time, it was believed that Nosair's assassination of Kahane was an antisemitic hate crime. In subsequent years, however, Nosair's actions have been re-evaluated as one of the earliest examples of Islamic terrorism in the United States.

Prosecution of Nosair 
Nosair was charged with the murder of Kahane. During the legal proceedings, Nosair denied all charges against him. Although there were witnesses who identified Nosair as the assassin, Nosair was not convicted of Kahane's assassination, in part because Kahane's family had opposed the performing of an autopsy after the assassination and the extracting of the bullets. However, Nosair was convicted of assault, possession of an illegal firearm, and of shooting a United States Postal Inspection Service agent. Nosair was sentenced to 22 years of imprisonment, the maximum allowed.

Conspiracy to free Nosair from prison 
Nosair was to serve his sentence at Attica Correctional Facility, in New York. In 1993, the "Blind Sheikh," Omar Abdel-Rahman, was arrested in New York. An investigation later revealed that a terrorist cell, led by Abdel-Rahman, conducted detailed surveillance of Attica facilities and that it had discussed plans to use a truck bomb attack, combined with an armed assault, to rescue Nosair from prison.

Nosair's confession of Kahane's assassination 
Several years after the 1993 World Trade Center bombing, Nosair made a confession to federal agents of assassinating Kahane.

Possible accomplices 
In August 2010, the Israeli newspaper The Jerusalem Post, which, in turn, quoted from the mid-August issue of Playboy, claimed that Nosair had two partners and that his original target was Israeli military figure and future Israeli Prime Minister Ariel Sharon. "He added that on the night he shot Kahane dead, he was accompanied by two co-conspirators to the Marriot Hotel in Manhattan where Kahane was speaking – one of whom was also carrying a gun. The men, Bilal al-Kaisi of Jordan and Mohammed A. Salameh, a Palestinian illegal alien later involved in the 1993 World Trade Center bombing, have never been charged for their part in the slaying."

See also 
 Jewish Defense League, a terrorist organization founded by Kahane

References

External links 
 Kahane Is Killed After Giving Talk in New York Hotel – published in The New York Times on 6 November 1990
 Kahane Suspect Is a Muslim With a Series of Addresses – published in The New York Times on 7 November 1990
 Kahane's Followers in Israel Bury Him and Vent Anger – published in The New York Times on 8 November 1990

Assassinations in the United States
Terrorist attacks attributed to Palestinian militant groups
1990 murders in the United States
Murder in New York City
1990 in New York City
1990s in Manhattan
Terrorist incidents in New York City
Islamic terrorism in New York (state)
November 1990 events in the United States
Deaths by firearm in Manhattan
Deaths by person in New York City
Meir Kahane